Céline S. Cousteau (born June 6, 1972) is a socio-environmental advocate and public figure. She is known for her work as a documentary film director, producer, explorer, artist, public speaker, brand ambassador and designer, and is a frequent panelist at the United Nations in New York. She is the Founder/Director of CauseCentric Productions and Co-founder/ Chairman of the Board of the Outdoor Film Fellowship. She is the daughter of ocean explorer and filmmaker Jean-Michel Cousteau, and granddaughter of Jacques Cousteau.

Early years and personal life
Cousteau is the third generation of the Cousteau family of explorers. She was born in California to Jean-Michel Cousteau, a documentary-filmmaker and environmental advocate, and Anne-Marie Cousteau, an expedition photographer. She is the sister of Fabien Cousteau, an ocean explorer and shark advocate, and granddaughter of pioneering ocean explorer Jacques Cousteau. She grew up in their family homes in France and the United States.

Cousteau spent much of her youth aboard her grandfather's research vessel the Calypso with her family. One of her first major expeditions on board was at age nine when she and her father and grandfather journeyed to the Amazon. There they spent 18 months navigating its coastal and jungle waters in areas that were still largely unknown to the outside world. This exploration also involved encounters with remote and un-contacted tribes. It was through this experience that Cousteau began to learn about the interconnectedness of not only the environment, but humanity. She has spent her life dedicated to understanding the human "tribe" and the relationships forged between individuals, communities and ecosystems; this has been the inspiration behind her films, artworks and activism.

She has one son with her partner Çapkin van Alphen, an Australian cameraman.

Education 
Cousteau attended the Norfolk Academy in Virginia and the United Nations International School in New York City, and graduated from Skidmore College in 1994, where she majored in psychology and minored in studio art. She received her master's degree in International and Intercultural Management from the School for International Training.

Career
Cousteau is the founder and CEO of CauseCentric Productions. CauseCentric Productions produces and distributes multi-media content with an emphasis on short films to amplify the voices and communicate the stories of solution focused grassroots organizations and individuals working on environmental and socio-cultural issues. She is also the founder of the Outdoor Film Fellowship, formerly the Céline Cousteau Film Fellowship, a film fellowship program that equips young filmmakers, creatives, and activists to motivate change through storytelling.

Most recently, Cousteau released her first feature documentary, Tribes on Edge, in 2019. The film was the result of her return to the Amazon in 2011, where she went in search of the indigenous tribes she first contacted with her grandfather aboard the Calypso. There she spent time with tribes of the Vale do Javari, Brazilian Amazon whose existence has since become threatened by the modern world.

Art and fashion 

 Spring/Summer 2016 - Ocean Mysteries Collection, Guest Designer for Swarovski
 Fall/Winter 2016 - Tribute to Tribe Collection, Guest Designer for Swarovski    
 Fall 2017 - Regenerating the Reef Couture Collection, Associate Designer for Deborah Milner

Ambassadorships and associations 

 International Spokeswoman, La Prairie skincare company (2007-2014)
 Sustainability Partner, Contiki Holidays (2010-2014)
 Advisory Council Member, Adventurers and Scientists for Conservation (2012)
 Council Member on Global Agenda Council of Oceans, World Economic Forum, (2012-2016)
 Ambassador, the TreadRight Foundation (2014–Present)
 Ambassador, Jane Goodall's Roots & Shoots program (2015) 
 Advisory Board Members, Marine Construction Technologies (2015–2019)
 Brand Ambassador, Keen Footwear (2016)
 Advisory Board Member, the Himalayan Consensus (2017-2019)
 Board of Directors, National Aquarium in Baltimore (2018–Present)

Filmography

References

External links

CauseCentric Productions
The Céline Cousteau Film Fellowship

Living people
American expatriates in France
Celine
American people of French descent
Skidmore College alumni
American explorers
People from Los Angeles County, California
1972 births
SIT Graduate Institute alumni
American documentary filmmakers
People from Provence
American environmentalists
American women environmentalists
French environmentalists
French women environmentalists
French documentary filmmakers
Female explorers
21st-century explorers
Artists from Norfolk, Virginia
Activists from California
American women documentary filmmakers
French documentary film producers
21st-century American women